John Curl (born September 10, 1940) is an American poet, memoirist, translator, author, activist and historian.

Early life and education 

Curl was born in New York City and grew up in Manhattan and rural New Jersey. His family was working class, a mixture of Irish-Catholic, English-Protestant, and Romanian-Austrian Jew. He attended CCNY, with a semester at the Sorbonne, and earned a bachelor's degree in Comparative Literature.

Career 
He has lived in Berkeley, California since 1971 with his wife Jill, a librarian, and has worked as a professional woodworker at Heartwood Cooperative Woodshop since 1974. Involved in the cooperative movement in the Bay Area since the early 1970s, he was a founding member of the InterCollective and an editor of the Collective Directory (1981–85). He is longtime chairman of West Berkeley Artisans and Industrial Companies (WEBAIC), promoting art and industrial zoning, has served as a Berkeley planning commissioner, and is a founding member of the Indigenous Peoples' Day Committee, which organizes the annual Berkeley Pow Wow. He is a longtime board member of PEN Oakland and PEN Center USA.

His best known book is probably his history of the cooperative and communalist movements, For All The People: Uncovering the Hidden History of Cooperation, Cooperative Movements, and Communalism in America (PM Press, 2009), which historian Howard Zinn described as "inspiring." Memories of Drop City (2007) is his memoir of the 1960s communal movement and the first "hippie" commune, in Colorado, where he lived between 1966–69, which Ishmael Reed called "highly crafted and brilliant," and Al Young described as "compelling." His play The Trial of Christopher Columbus was produced by the PEN Oakland Writers Theater in Berkeley (2009).

He is author of seven books of poetry, including Scorched Birth (2004), which former San Francisco poet laureate Jack Hirschman called "a book of wonders." His poetry books include Columbus in the Bay of Pigs (1991); Decade (1987); and Tidal News (1982); and has published poems in numerous magazines and anthologies, including Words Upon the Waters, Oakland Out Loud, Blake Times, Left Curve, Central Park, Poetry USA, Anthology of East Bay Poets, Poetry Flash, and Pulse of the People. He was a member of the San Francisco Cloud House circle of poets in the 1980s.  In 1975 his series of 22 Wall Poems in spray paint and broadsides were published in Insurrection/Resurrection. He was co-host of Poetry for the People radio show on KPOO San Francisco, 1979-1980. He edited Red Coral, a web zine, between 1999 and 2003. He represented the USA at the World Poetry Festival in Caracas, Venezuela, in 2010. Poet Mary Rudge called him "a Master Poet who uses language in a remarkable, innovative way, he gives us information on contradictions in the evolving state of human consciousness." An anthology of his poetry translated into Spanish by Rei Berroa was scheduled to be published by Editorial el Perro y la Rana (Caracas) in 2011.

His study of American Indian languages, beginning with Navajo at the Tohajiilee Indian Reservation in New Mexico, led to his translations in Ancient American Poets (2005) of three poets of ancient Indigenous America: Flower Songs by Nezahualcoyotl (Nahuatl–Aztec), Songs of Dzitbalche by Ah Bam (Yucatec Maya), and The Sacred Hymns of the Situa by Pachacuti (Quechua–Inca), along with biographies of the poets. Some of these translations are featured on the web site of FAMSI (Foundation for the Advancement of Meso-American Studies, Inc.), which is scheduled to merge into the Los Angeles County Museum of Art (LACMA) web site. His transcriptions of Pachacuti poems form the libretto for classical composer Tania León's Ancient (2009).

A second expanded edition of For All The People, with a  new foreword by Ishmael Reed, was published by PM Press in 2012. Curl's collected poems, Revolutionary Alchemy, with a foreword by San Francisco poet laureate Jack Hirschman, came out that same year. Hirschman wrote: "The importance of this book and John Curl in the pantheon of revolutionary poets… Revolutionary Alchemy is a book of major importance. John Curl has earned a place—with this book of poems—among the foremost revolutionary American poets since the end of WW2."

Bibliography 
History
 History of Work Cooperation in America (1980)
 History of Collectivity in the San Francisco Bay Area (1982)
 For All the People: Uncovering the Hidden History of Cooperation, Cooperative Movements, and Communalism in America (2009, 2012)

Memoir
 Memories of Drop City: The First Hippie Commune and the Summer of Love (2007)

Novels
 The Co-Op Conspiracy (2014)
 The Outlaws of Maroon (2019)

Translation
 Ancient American Poets (2005)

Poetry
 Change/Tears (1967)
 Commu 1 (1971)
 Insurrection/Resurrection (1975)
 Spring Ritual (1978)
 Ride the Wind (1979)
 Cosmic Athletics (1980)
 Tidal News (1982)
 Decade: the 1990s (1987)
 Columbus in the Bay of Pigs (1991)
 Scorched Birth (2004),
 Revolutionary Alchemy (2012)

Videos
 The Columbus Invasion (1991)
 The Heights of Hungry Coyote (1990)
 Wall Poems (YouTube 2012)
 Nezahualcoyotl, Poet of Ancient Mexico (YouTube 2012)
 Songs of Dzitbalché by Ah Bam (YouTube 2012)

References

Further reading 
 Curl, John (Spring 2016). "Reclaiming the American Commons". ROAR Magazine. pp. 78–85

External links

 * Publisher's bio of John Curl
 Z net interview
 Living In The U.X.A.: The Self-Help Movement in California in the Great Depression by John Curl, East Bay Express, 1983 (in Countercurrents & also same article with more pics on red-coral.net)
 Passion for Community Revealed in Curl's History of Co-ops, 2009 interview in Berkeley Daily Planet
 Lessons for Building a Co-operative Movement, an Interview with John Curl: Grassroots Economic Organizing
 Video interview with Jai Jai Noire
 Interview with Professor Richard P. Wolff

1940 births
Living people
American male poets
American poets
21st-century American memoirists
21st-century American historians
American people of Irish descent
American people of English descent
American people of Austrian-Jewish descent
American people of Romanian-Jewish descent
Writers from New York City
Writers from Berkeley, California
People of intentional communities
Poets from New York (state)
City College of New York alumni
American expatriates in France
Activists from California
American male non-fiction writers
21st-century American translators
Translators from Nahuatl
Translators from Mayan
Translators from Quechua
Translators to English